Artur Abreu Pereira (born 11 August 1994 in Niederkorn, Luxembourg) is a Luxembourgish professional footballer who currently plays for Union Titus Pétange.

Career

Union Titus Pétange

Recording 11 goals with Union Titus Pétange in the 2015-16 Luxembourg second division, Abreu helped the club achieve promotion to the 2016-17 Luxembourg National Division. However, he had to spend ten weeks recovering from an injury and had not fully rehabilitated by the start of the season.

In 2017, the Luxembourgish midfielder aimed to represent Luxembourg in their 2018 World Cup qualifying fixture against France but was never selected.

Vitória S.C.

Trialling for Vitória S.C. of the Portuguese Primeira Liga in 2017, Abreu officially became a player for the club in June that year and was placed in their reserve team where he opened his scoring account with a goal in a 1-0 league triumph over SL Benfica B.

References

External links 

 at Soccerway

1994 births
Living people
Luxembourgian people of Portuguese descent
Association football midfielders
Luxembourgian footballers
CS Pétange players
FC Differdange 03 players
Vitória S.C. players
Luxembourg National Division players
Luxembourgian expatriate footballers
Expatriate footballers in Portugal